Strahil Popov (born 31 August 1990) is a Bulgarian professional footballer who plays for Turkish club Ümraniyespor and the Bulgarian national team. He mainly plays as a right back.

Popov began his professional career at Litex Lovech in 2008. After loan spells at Lokomotiv Mezdra and Montana he became a regular in their team, playing 159 total games and scoring 6 goals for Litex. He signed for Kasımpaşa in January 2016.

Popov is a Bulgaria international, having represented his country at under-19 and under-21 level. He made his senior international debut in May 2014, aged 23, in a friendly match against Canada.

Club career
Born in Blagoevgrad, Popov began his career playing for Pirin Blagoevgrad before departing for Pirin 2001.

Litex Lovech
In 2008, Popov joined Litex Lovech.

Lokomotiv Mezdra (loan)
On 9 July 2009, Popov joined Lokomotiv Mezdra on loan until December 2009. He made his team début on 10 July, scoring goal in a 1–2 friendly loss against Sivasspor.

Montana (loan)
On 18 January 2010, Popov was loaned out to Montana for the rest of the season. He made his competitive debut on 20 March in a 0–0 home league draw against Litex, coming on as a second-half substitute, and participated in only one more game to the end of the season.

Return to Litex
Popov returned to Litex at the end of the 2009–10 season. He played only three league games during a following campaign and became a regular first team player in the 2011–12 season. On 21 March 2012, Popov was sent off for the first time in his professional career in a 1–1 away draw against Beroe Stara Zagora.

On 21 July 2013, Popov scored his first goal for Litex, with a header, netting the third in a 4–1 home win over Neftochimic Burgas. He then scored the winning goal in Litex's 2–1 away win against Slavia Sofia on 7 December.

On 3 August 2014, Popov was announced as Litex's new club captain. Six days later, he added his third goal for Litex against Botev Plovdiv in a 3–3 away draw.

Kasımpaşa
On 5 January 2016, he moved to the Turkish Süper Lig team Kasımpaşa for a reported fee of €750 000. He was given the number 90 jersey.

On 27 October 2017, he scored his first league goal in a match against Göztepe.

International career
After first being called up for a friendly match against Belarus in March 2014, but remaining an unused substitute, Popov made his debut for the national side on 23 May 2014, in the 1–1 draw with Canada. He played as a starter on 10 October 2015, in the 0–3 loss against Croatia in a Euro 2016 qualifier, remaining on the pitch for the full 90 minutes.

On 13 October 2018, he provided two decisive assists in a 2–1 home win against Cyprus, in a match for the 2018–19 UEFA Nations League. He became second top assistant with four assists in all over group in the competition.

Statistics

Club

International

Awards

Club
Litex Lovech
 Bulgarian A PFG 2010/2011
 Bulgarian Cup –  2009
 Bulgarian Supercup 2010

Individual
 Best defender in A Group: 2015

References

External links

1990 births
Sportspeople from Blagoevgrad
Living people
Bulgarian footballers
Bulgaria youth international footballers
Bulgaria under-21 international footballers
Bulgaria international footballers
Association football fullbacks
Association football defenders
PFC Litex Lovech players
PFC Lokomotiv Mezdra players
FC Montana players
Kasımpaşa S.K. footballers
Hatayspor footballers
Eyüpspor footballers
Ümraniyespor footballers
First Professional Football League (Bulgaria) players
Süper Lig players
TFF First League players
Bulgarian expatriate footballers
Expatriate footballers in Turkey
Bulgarian expatriate sportspeople in Turkey